Canyoneer is the first full-length studio album by the melodic hardcore band No Trigger. It was released on Nitro Records.

Track listing

References

External links
 No Trigger Artist Page at Nitro Records

2006 debut albums
No Trigger albums
Nitro Records albums
Albums produced by Bill Stevenson (musician)